Halutie Hor (born 4 April 1999) is a Ghanaian sprinter from Nmanduonu in the Upper West Region. 

She competed at the 2018 Commonwealth Games in both the 100 metres and the 4x100 metres relay. In the 100 metres Hor qualified for the final where she finished eighth in a time of 11.54seconds, 0.44seconds behind gold medalist Michelle-Lee Ahye from Trinidad and Tobago. 

In the 4x100 metres relay she was part of a Ghanaian team that qualified for the final where they finished fifth in a time of 43.64seconds.

References

1999 births
Living people
Ghanaian female sprinters
Commonwealth Games competitors for Ghana
Athletes (track and field) at the 2018 Commonwealth Games
Place of birth missing (living people)
Athletes (track and field) at the 2019 African Games
African Games competitors for Ghana
21st-century Ghanaian women